AFL Britain, also referred to as AFL Great Britain was established in 1989 as the governing body for Australian rules football in England, Wales and Scotland. It was formed in 2008, replacing the British Australian Rules Football League (BARFL) as national body.

By 2012, Wales and Scotland had created their own autonomous bodies governing the sport of Australian rules football and AFL Britain was superseded by AFL England.

See also

AFL England
Australian Rules Football in England
Australian rules football in Scotland
Australian rules football in the United Kingdom

References

Sports governing bodies in the United Kingdom
Australian rules football in Great Britain
Brit
Sports organizations established in 2008